The Gambling Commission is an executive non-departmental public body of the Government of the United Kingdom responsible for regulating gambling and supervising gaming law in Great Britain. Its remit covers arcades, betting, bingo, casinos, slot machines and lotteries, as well as remote gambling, but not spread betting. Free prize competitions and draws are free of the Commission’s control under the "Gambling Act 2005" 

The stated aims of the Commission are to keep crime out of gambling, and to protect the vulnerable. It issues licences to operators, and advises the government on gambling-related issues. It also collaborates with the police over suspected illegal gambling.
The Commission replaced the Gaming Board for Great Britain in 2007. In 2013 it assumed responsibility for regulating the National Lottery.

History
The Gambling Commission was established under the Gambling Act 2005 and assumed full powers in 2007, taking over responsibility from the Gaming Board for Great Britain, in regulating arcades, betting, bingo, casinos, slot machines and lotteries, but not spread betting (regulated by the Financial Conduct Authority). The Commission is a non-departmental public body, sponsored by the Department for Culture, Media and Sport.

It is also responsible for the remote gambling which includes betting online, by telephone and other communication devices using the equipment, that offer or advertise services to the residents of Great Britain.

On 1 October 2013 the National Lottery Commission, which regulated the National Lottery, became part of the Gambling Commission.

In October 2020, the Commission published results of an investigation of BGO, GAN, and NetBet, three UK online gambling operators. The Commission concluded that in the period between September 2018 and March 2020 the operators did not make enough efforts to keep gamblers' safe and prevent money laundering.

In April 2021, Chief Executive Neil McArthur announced that he will step down as CEO of the Commission.

Responsibilities

Aims and objectives 
The Commission's stated aims are "to keep crime out of gambling, to ensure that gambling is conducted fairly and openly, and to protect children and vulnerable people". However, critics note its ADR process and default non-disclosure of complaints as often part of "standard procedure" contrasts directly with the validity of this claimed remit.

The Commission released a new 2018/19 business plan with the goals of improving industry standards, consumer protections and to further public protection from gambling related harm. From December, 2020 through February, 2021, the Commission invited public comment on improving the quality and timeliness of its statistics regarding problem gambling.

Licensing 
The Commission issues licences to gambling operators, can levy fines and revoke licences, and is tasked with investigating and prosecuting illegal gambling. It is also responsible for advising national and local government on gambling-related issues.

Remote gambling 
For remote gambling, the Commission issues licences to those operators whose remote gambling equipment is located in the territory of Great Britain. Whilst, those operators who wish to advertise their services in England, Wales, or Scotland, but are based outside the country, have to obtain a licence from the Gambling Commission following the passage of the Gambling (Licensing and Advertising) Act 2014. The 2014 Act changed the licensing requirements so that any company wishing to advertise gambling and take bets from consumers in England, Wales, or Scotland must hold a licence issued by the Gambling Commission. Previously, an operator in one of the whitelisted gambling jurisdictions could advertise their services in Great Britain without requiring a separate license from the Commission. The proposals were opposed by the gambling industry, including the Gibraltar Betting and Gaming Association.

Monitoring and regulation
The list of responsibilities of the Gambling Commission includes work to ensure that licensees act in accordance with the requirements imposed by the Gambling Act 2005 and other related regulations and standards. The Commission has the right to visit its licensees and examine their financial activities. As a result of this examination, specialists from the Gambling Commission can issue recommendations for amendments. Apart from such advice, supplementary licence conditions can be set or removed. In some cases, the Commission may take action to correct or avoid certain misconducts.

Apart from reviewing the activities of the licensed operators, the Commission is authorised to take regulatory actions against those licensees who breach the rules in some way. The range of actions that may need to be taken varies from issuing a warning to inflicting a fine on those who violate licence conditions. In situations where additional investigation is required, the licence can be revoked.

The Intelligence department of the Gambling Commission collects information about the illegal activities related to their field and conducts preliminary investigation to build a picture of the situation and inform senior management. They also collaborate with other UK organisations and the police in cases where suspicious betting or gambling activities are detected.

The list of operators and personal licence holders who have had a regulatory sanction imposed on them is published on the site of the Gambling Commission.

Notable actions 

In December 2016 the Gambling Commission fined Camelot Group £3 million for failing to verify a fraudulent National Lottery ticket that had been presented in 2009. The Commission found that Camelot had poor fraud prevention controls in place and that it had breached the terms of its licence. The case was subsequently investigated by police, who found that a Camelot employee who worked in Camelot's fraud department had conspired with a member of the public to claim a jackpot prize of £2.5 million using a bogus ticket.

In February 2018, the Commission fined British bookmaker William Hill £6.2 million for not protecting players after a series of systematic failures to prevent money laundering.

The Commission issued a £600,000 penalty to LeoVegas in May 2018 for producing misleading adverts to customers as well as several self-exclusion failings. The following month, in June 2018, the Commission fined 32Red £2 million for failing a problem gambler who had deposited £758,000 with 32Red over more than two years. 32Red had failed to check the customer, who had a net income of £2,150 per month, could afford the bets despite several previous regulatory rulings in this area.

On 31 July 2019 the Commission announced that Ladbrokes Coral would pay £5.9m for past failings in anti-money laundering and social responsibility. An investigation found that the companies failed to put in place effective safeguards to prevent consumers suffering gambling harm and against money laundering between November 2014 and October 2017.

Criticisms
The Gambling Commission has come under fire for not preventing the spread of Fixed odds betting terminals on the high street. Their spread is linked to the transfer of responsibility for planning permission for bookmakers moving from the Gambling Commission to local authorities.

In 2014, the UK-regulated online bookmaker Canbet went into receivership, owing millions to customers. The demise of this site raised questions of the ability of the Commission to protect UK customers from rogue traders, although overall responsibility for UK online regulation was only given to the UKGC in November 2014.

In September 2014, UK-regulated online bookmaker BetButler closed down, leaving a message on its website reading "The Board of BetButler Limited has been approached by a third party regulated gaming business to acquire the customer database, including all balances and pending withdrawal requests, of the business. This process will take some days to complete." Concerns were raised about pay out times and their financial state many months before this appeared. Again, the Gambling Commission have been criticised.

Charities 
In January 2020 UK Gambling Commission approves three charities for compulsory funding from gambling operators.

See also
 Gaming Control Board
 Problem gambling
 Gambling in the United Kingdom
 History of gambling in the United Kingdom
 Lottery fraud

References

External links
 The Gambling Commission
 Video discussing move to Birmingham in November 2010

Gambling regulators
2005 in British law
Department for Digital, Culture, Media and Sport
Non-departmental public bodies of the United Kingdom government
Gambling in the United Kingdom
Organisations based in Birmingham, West Midlands
2007 establishments in the United Kingdom
Organizations established in 2007